Rocherlea is a residential locality in the local government area (LGA) of Launceston in the Launceston LGA region of Tasmania. The 2016 census recorded a population of 1081 for the state suburb of Rocherlea.
It is a northern suburb of Launceston, about ten minutes drive from the Launceston CBD and on the way to Lilydale. It has a community centre, church and op shop.

History 
Rocherlea was gazetted as a locality in 1963.

The suburb was named after the Town Clerk's family "Rocher" and was originally referred to as "Rocher's Lane" before being officially gazetted as Rocherlea in 1963.

Geography
Almost all of the boundaries are survey lines.

Road infrastructure 
Route B81 (Lilydale Road) runs through from west to north.

References

Suburbs of Launceston, Tasmania
Localities of City of Launceston